Enrico Glicenstein (24 May 1870 – 30 December 1942) was a Polish-born sculptor who lived in Italy and the United States.

Life
Glicenstein was born in Turek, Poland in 1870 and named Enoch Hendryk Glicenstein. His father was a teacher who also worked as a monumental mason. He initially showed interest in being a rabbi whilst working in Łódź painting signs and carving wood.  After studying in Munich at the Royal Bavarian Academy of Art he married Helena Hirszenberg in 1896. The couple lived in Rome where  he adopted the name "Enrico". His son Emanuel was born in Rome, and Glicenstein became an Italian citizen.

Leaving Italy
In 1906, Glicenstein returned from a trip to Germany and exhibited his paintings there until World War I broke out and he moved his family to Poland. He took over the Chair belonging to Xawery Dunikowski at the University of Warsaw in 1910. At the end of the war the family lived in Switzerland until they emigrated to London in 1920. During the next eight years he exhibited first in London and later in Rome and Venice.

America
Glicenstein emigrated to America in 1928 with his son Emanuel. His wife and daughter joined him in New York in 1935. Glicenstein wanted to go to Palestine but he died in a car accident in 1942. His son became a notable painter and lived in Safed in Israel.

Legacy
The Glicenstein Museum was founded in Safed, Israel. It became the Israel Bible Museum in 1985, and many Glicenstein sculptures are still displayed there. In 2008 the Deputy Mayor of Safed was indicted for stealing paintings that had been put in storage when the Glicenstein Museum changed its role.

Glicenstein's works are found in a number of collections including the Musée d'Art Moderne de la Ville de Paris and the Pompidou Centre, the Israel Museum, the Galleria Nazionale d'Arte Moderna in Rome, the Krakow and the Warsaw National Museum, the Brooklyn Museum, the Metropolitan Museum of Art and the United States Holocaust Memorial Museum. Glicenstein has papers in the Smithsonian.

Jean Cassou has published a book on Glicenstein Sculpture. Portraits of Glicenstein and his daughter Beatrice were made by his son Emanuel Glicen Romano. (His son changed his name to avoid being accused of exploiting his father's fame).

References

External links
 

American people of Polish-Jewish descent
Polish sculptors
Polish male sculptors
Jewish sculptors
People from Turek County
Road incident deaths in New York City
1870 births
1942 deaths
20th-century American sculptors
20th-century American male artists
American male sculptors
Sculptors Guild members
Polish expatriates in the United Kingdom
Polish emigrants to the United States
Federal Art Project artists